Earl of Surrey is a title in the Peerage of England that has been created five times. It was first created for William de Warenne, a close companion of William the Conqueror. It is currently held as a subsidiary title by the Dukes of Norfolk.

History 
The Earldom of Surrey was first created in 1088 for William de Warenne, as a reward for loyal service to William during the Conquest. He received the lordship of Reigate Castle in Surrey, but also had holdings in twelve other counties. Perhaps because he held little property in Surrey, the earldom came to be more commonly called of Warenne. The name Warenne comes from the name of their property in Normandy where the family's ancestral castle, Bellencombre, was located on the Varenne River. 
It was held by William de Warenne's son and grandson, both also named William, and then by the husbands of Isabella, daughter of the third William de Warenne. The first of these was William of Blois, son of King Stephen, and the second was Hamelin, half-brother of Henry II. The latter took the de Warenne surname, and a son, grandson, and great-great-grandson of Hamelin and Isabella subsequently held the earldom. 
With the failure of the second de Warenne male line in 1347, the earldom passed to Richard FitzAlan, 10th Earl of Arundel, who was a nephew of the last de Warenne earl, although he did not assume the title until after the death of the previous earl's widow in 1361. It was also held by his son, who forfeited it upon his execution in 1397.

John Holland, who was a grandson of the first Fitzalan earl of Surrey, was then created Duke of Surrey. He held the title for 2 years until he was stripped of it by Henry IV, who restored the earldom to the Fitzalans. The restored earl died in 1415 without male heirs, whereupon the earldom of Surrey became either extinct or abeyant (authorities disagree on this), while the earldom of Arundel passed to his 1st cousin once removed, who was great-grandson of the 9th Earl of Surrey (and consequently also descended from the de Warennes).

The title was revived several times during the 15th century, for John de Mowbray in 1451, and then for Richard of Shrewsbury in 1477. Both died without issue, leaving the title extinct once more.

In 1483 the title was revived for Thomas Howard, who later became Duke of Norfolk, and it has been held by this family ever since (with some breaks during which their titles were forfeited but later restored). The Dukes of Norfolk quarter the de Warrenne arms on their coat of arms. The 4th earl of this creation also inherited the earldom of Arundel, thus re-uniting the two earldoms.

William de Warenne, 1st Earl of Surrey was granted the Manor of Wakefield by the crown and his descendants, the Earls Warenne, inherited it when he died in 1088. The building of Sandal Castle was begun early in the 12th century by William de Warenne, 2nd Earl of Surrey (1081–1138) who was granted the Sandal estates in 1107 and it became the stronghold of the manor. A second castle was built at Lawe Hill on the north side of the Calder but was abandoned. Wakefield formed the caput of an extensive baronial holding that extended to Cheshire and Lancashire and was held by the Warennes 
until the 14th century, when it passed to Warenne heirs.

List of titleholders

Earls of Surrey or Warenne (1088) 

The Warenne Earls were called Earl de Warenne at least as often as Earl of Surrey; but they received the 'third penny' of Surrey, which means that they were entitled to one third of the county court fines. The numbering of the earls follows the Oxford Dictionary of National Biography; some sources number Isabel's husbands as the fourth and fifth earls, increasing the numbering of the later earls by one.
 William de Warenne, 1st Earl of Surrey (died 1088)
 William de Warenne, 2nd Earl of Surrey (died 1138), earldom attainted in 1101, restored 1103
 William de Warenne, 3rd Earl of Surrey (1119–1148)
 Isabel de Warenne, Countess of Surrey (died 1203)
 William I, Count of Boulogne, Earl of Surrey (c. 1137–1159), her first husband, younger son of King Stephen of England.
 Hamelin de Warenne, Earl of Surrey (died 1202), her second husband, illegitimate son of Geoffrey of Anjou. He was called Warenne after his marriage. 
 William de Warenne, 5th Earl of Surrey (died 1240)
 John de Warenne, 6th Earl of Surrey (1231–1304) 
 John de Warenne, 7th Earl of Surrey (1286–1347), grandson.

 Richard FitzAlan, 10th Earl of Arundel, 8th Earl of Surrey (1313–1376), nephew. 
 Richard FitzAlan, 11th Earl of Arundel, 9th Earl of Surrey (1346–1397, forfeited 1397)
 Thomas FitzAlan, 12th Earl of Arundel, 10th Earl of Surrey (1381–1415, restored 1400)

Dukes of Surrey (1397) 
 Thomas Holland, 1st Duke of Surrey (1374–1400, forfeit 1399)

Earl of Surrey and Warenne (1451) 
 John de Mowbray, 1st Earl of Surrey and Warenne (1444–1476), nephew of the last FitzAlan earl. Succeeded as 4th Duke of Norfolk in 1461. Title extinct at his death without sons.

Earl of Warenne (1477) 
Richard of Shrewsbury, younger son of Edward IV, was created Earl of Warenne and Duke of Norfolk on 7 February 1477, when he was three years old. He then married (15 January 1478) Anne Mowbray, only daughter of John de Mowbray above, when both were four. He was one of the Princes in the Tower, and died there at an uncertain date. Titles went extinct upon his death with no heirs.

Earls of Surrey (1483) 
 Thomas Howard, 1st Earl of Surrey (1443–1524), a descendant of Thomas de Mowbray, 1st Duke of Norfolk through a female, Howard was a second cousin of the last Earl. 
Forfeited in 1485 after the Battle of Bosworth, where his father was killed and attainted. Restored as Earl of Surrey in 1489; created Duke of Norfolk in 1514, and resigned the Earldom to his son on the same day. 
 Thomas Howard, 3rd Duke of Norfolk, 2nd Earl of Surrey (1473–1554) Attainted 1547; restored 1553.
 Henry Howard, Earl of Surrey (courtesy title) (1517–1547), the poet; attainted and executed.
 Thomas Howard, 4th Duke of Norfolk, 3rd Earl of Surrey (1536–1572, forfeit at his attainder and execution)
Philip Howard, 1st Earl of Arundel, (1557–1595), by courtesy Earl of Surrey from 1554 to 1572; inherited the Earldom of Arundel from his mother's father in 1580. All his titles were forfeit when he was attainted in 1589. 
 Thomas Howard, 2nd Earl of Arundel, 4th Earl of Surrey (1585–1646, restored 1604), also created Earl of Norfolk in 1644
 Henry Frederick Howard, 3rd Earl of Arundel, 5th Earl of Surrey (1608–1652).
 Thomas Howard, 5th Duke of Norfolk, 6th Earl of Surrey (1627–1677, restored to the Dukedom of Norfolk in 1660)

The earldom has subsequently always been held by the Duke of Norfolk.

External links 
 Medieval Lands Project on the Earls of Surrey

Noble titles created in 1088
Noble titles created in 1451
Noble titles created in 1483
Earldoms in the Peerage of England